Gaidar is a commune and village in the Gagauz Autonomous Territorial Unit of the Republic of Moldova.  The 2004 census listed the commune as having a population of 4,525 people.   Gagauz total 4,368. Minorities included  32 Moldovans, 47 Russians, 25 Ukrainians, 37 Bulgarians and 12 Roma.

References

Gaidar